Trauma- and violence-informed care (TVIC) describes a framework for working with and relating to people who have experienced negative consequences after exposure to dangerous experiences. There is no one single TVIC framework, or model, and some go by slightly different names, including Trauma Informed Care (TIC). They incorporate a number of perspectives, principles and skills. TVIC frameworks can be applied in many contexts including medicine, mental health, law, education, architecture, addiction, gender, culture, and interpersonal relationships. They can be applied by individuals and organizations.

Most TVIC principles emphasize the need to understand the scope of what constitutes danger and how resulting trauma impacts human health, thoughts, feelings, behaviors, communications, and relationships. Exposure to life-altering danger necessitates a need for careful and healthy attention to creating safety within healing relationships. Client-centered and capacity-building approaches are emphasized. Most frameworks incorporate a biopsychosocial perspective, attending to the integrated effects on biology (body and brain), psychology (mind), and sociology (relationship).

A basic view of trauma-informed care (TIC) involves developing a holistic appreciation of the potential effects of trauma with the goal of expanding the care-provider's empathy while creating a feeling of safety. Under this view, it is often stated that a trauma-informed approach asks not "What is wrong with you?" but rather "What happened to you?" A more expansive view includes developing an understanding of danger-response. In this view, danger is understood to be broad, include relationship dangers, and can be subjectively experienced. Danger exposure is understood to impact someone's past and present adaptive responses and information processing patterns.

History 
Harris and Fallot first articulated trauma-informed care (TIC) in 2001. They focused on three primary issues: instituting universal trauma screening and assessment, not causing re-traumatization through the delivery methods of professional services, and promoting an understanding of the biopsychosocial nature and effects of trauma.

Researchers and government agencies immediately began expanding on the concept. In the 2000's, the Substance Abuse and Mental Health Services Administration (SAMHSA) began to measure the effectiveness of TIC programs. The U.S. Congress created the National Child Traumatic Stress Network which SAMHSA administers. SAMHSA commissioned a longitudinal study, the Women, Co-Occurring Disorders and Violence Study (WCDVS) to produce empirical knowledge on the development and effectiveness of a comprehensive approach to help women with mental health, substance abuse, and trauma histories.

Several significant events happened in 2005. SAMHSA formed the National Center for Trauma-Informed Care. Elliott, Fallot and colleagues identified a consensus of 10 TIC concepts for working with individuals. They more finely parsed Harris and Fallot's earlier ideas, and included relational collaboration, strengths and resilience, cultural competence, and consumer input. They offered application examples, such as providing parenting support to create healing for parents and their children. Huntington and colleagues reviewed the WCDVS data, and working with a steering committee, they reached a consensus on a framework of four core principles for organizations to implement.

 Organizations and services must be integrated to meet the needs of the relevant population.
 Settings and services for this population must be trauma-informed.
 Consumer/survivor/recovering persons must be integrated into the design and provision of services.
 A comprehensive array of services must be made available.

In 2011 SAMHSA issued a policy statement that all mental health service systems should identify and apply TIC principles. The TIC concept expanded into specific disciplines such as education, child welfare agencies, homeless shelters, and domestic violence services. SAMHSA issued a more comprehensive statement about the TIC concept in 2014, described below.

The term  (TVIC) was first used by Browne and colleagues in 2014, in the context of developing strategies for primary health care organizations. In 2016, the Canadian Department of Justice published "Trauma- (and violence-) informed approaches to supporting victims of violence: Policy and practice considerations".

In many ways TIC/TVIC concepts and models overlap or incorporate other models, and there is some debate about whether there is a difference. The confusion may be due to whether TVIC is seen as a model instead of a framework or approach which brings in knowledge and techniques from other models. A client/person-centered approach is fundamental to Rogerian and humanistic models, and foundational in ethical codes for lawyers and medical professionals. Attachment-informed healing professionals conceptualize their essential role as being a transitional attachment figure (TAF), where they focus on providing protection from danger, safety, and appropriate comfort in the professional relationship. TIC proponents argue the concept promotes a deeper awareness of the many forms of danger and trauma, and the scope and lifetime effects exposure to danger can cause. The prolific use of TVIC may be evidence it is a practical and useful framework, concept, model, or set of strategies for helping-professionals.

What is trauma and violence? 
Trauma can result from a wide range of experiences which expose humans to one or more physical, emotional, and/or relational dangers.

 Physical: Physical injury, brain injury, assault, crime, natural disaster, war, pain, and situational harm like vehicle or industrial accidents.
 Relational—adult: Interpersonal trauma, domestic violence, intimate partner violence, controlling behavior and coercive control, betrayal, gaslighting, DARVO, traumatic bonding, and intense emotional experiences such as shame and humiliation.
 Relational—child: For children, it can also involve childhood trauma, adverse childhood experiences, separation distress, and negative attachment experience (controlling, dismissive, inconsistent, harsh, or harmful caregiving environments).
 Social/structural: Social and political, structural violence, racism, historical, collective, national, poverty, religious, educational, the various forms of slavery, and cultural environments.
 PTSD: Non-complex or complex post-traumatic stress disorder, and continuous traumatic stress.
 Psychological and pharmacological: Psychological harm, mental disorders, drug addiction, isolation, and solitary confinement.
 Secondary: Vicarious or secondary exposure to other's trauma.

Van der Kolk describes trauma as an experience and response to exposure to one or more overwhelming dangers, which causes harm to neurobiological functioning, and leaves a person with impaired ability to identify and manage dangers. This leaves them "constantly fighting unseen dangers".

Crittenden describes how relational dangers in childhood caregiving environments can cause chronic trauma: "Some parents are dangerous to their children. Stated more accurately, all parents harm their children more or less, just as all are more or less protective and comforting." Parenting, or caregiver, styles which are dismissive, inconsistent, harsh, abusive or expose children to other physical or relational dangers can cause a trauma which impairs neurodevelopment. Children adapt to achieve maximum caregiver protection, but the adaptation may be maladaptive if used in other relationships. The Dynamic-Maturational Model of Attachment and Adaptation (DMM) describes how children's repeated exposure to dangers can result in lifespan impairments to information processing.

Because danger to humans is so widespread, trauma is extremely common, although the effects of negative and ongoing experience is less common. The effects are dimensional and can vary in scope and degree.

TVIC frameworks 
Trauma- and violence-informed care, or closely related concepts, are also described as trauma- (and violence-) informed care (T(V)IC),  and trauma-informed care/practice (TIC/P). Other terms include trauma-informed, trauma-informed approach, trauma-informed perspective, trauma-focused, trauma-based, trauma-sensitive, and trauma-informed practice (TIP). There are many TVIC-related concepts, principles, approaches, frameworks, or models, some general and some more context specific.

The U.S. government's Substance Abuse and Mental Health Services Administration (SAMHSA) is an agency which has given significant attention to trauma-informed care. SAMHSA sought to develop a broad definition of the concept. It starts with "the three E's of trauma": Event(s), Experience of events, and Effect. SAMHSA offers four assumptions about a TIC approach with the four R's: Realizing the widespread impact of trauma, Recognizing the signs and symptoms, Responding with a trauma-informed approach, and Resisting re-traumatization. SAMHSA gives six key principles: safety; trustworthiness and transparency; peer support; collaboration and mutuality; empowerment, voice and choice, and; cultural, historical and gender issues. They also list 10 implementation domains: governance and leadership; policy; physical environment; engagement and involvement; cross sector collaboration; screening, assessment and treatment services; training and workforce development; progress monitoring and quality assurance; financing; and evaluation.

Researchers Wathen and colleagues describe four integrated principles evolved by key authors in this field.

 Understand structural and interpersonal experiences of trauma and violence and their impacts on peoples' lives and behaviors.
 Create emotionally, culturally, and physically safe spaces for service users and providers.
 Foster opportunities for choice, collaboration, and connections.
 Provide strengths-based and capacity building ways to support service users.

By comparison, Landini, a child and adolescent psychiatrist, describes five primary principles from DMM theory for helping people better manage danger response.

 Define problems in terms of response to danger.
 The professional acts as a transitional attachment figure.
 Explore the family's past and present responses to danger.
 Work progressively and recursively with the family.
 Practice reflective integration with the client as a form of teaching reflective integration.
Bowen and Murshid identified a framework of seven core TIC principles for social policy development.

 Safety
 Trustworthiness
 Transparency
 Collaboration
 Empowerment
 Choice
 intersectionality

Researchers Mitchell and colleagues searched for a consensus of TIC principles among early intervention specialists.

 A trauma-informed early intervention psychosis service will work to protect the service user from ongoing abuse.
 Staff within a trauma-informed early intervention psychosis service are trained to understand the link between trauma and psychosis and will be knowledgeable about trauma and its effects.
 A trauma-informed early intervention psychosis service will:
 Seek agreement and consent from the service user before beginning any intervention;
 Build a trusting relationship with the service user;
 Provide appropriate training on trauma-informed care for all staff;
 Support staff in delivering safe assessment and treatments for the effects of trauma;
 Adopt a person-centred approach;
 Maintain a safe environment for service users;
 Have a calm, compassionate and supportive ethos;
 Be trustworthy;
 Acknowledge the relevance of psychological therapies;
 Be sensitive when discussing trauma;
 Be empathetic and non-judgmental;
 Provide supervision to staff;
 Provide regular supervision to practitioners who are working directly with trauma.

General applications and techniques of TVIC 
SAMHSA's National Center for Trauma-Informed Care provides resources for developing a trauma-informed approach, including: (1) interventions; (2) national referral resources; and (3) information on how to shift from a paradigm that asks, "What's wrong with you?" to one that asks, "What has happened to you?"

Understand 
Gaining knowledge about and understanding the effects of trauma may be the most complicated component of TVIC, because it generally requires going beyond surface level explanations and using multiple explanatory theories and models or complex biopsychosocial models.

Trauma related behaviors, thoughts, feelings, and current experiences can seem confusing, perplexing, dysfunctional, or dangerous. These are usually adaptions to survive extreme contexts, methods to cope in the current moment, or efforts to communicate pain. Whatever the cause and adaptation, the professional's response can cause more harm, or some measure of emotional co-regulation, lessening of distress, and healing.

Safety 
The opposite of danger is safety, and most or all TVIC models emphasize the provision of safety. Van der Kolk describes how the "Brain and body are [neurobiologically] programmed to run for home, where safety can be restored and stress hormones can come to rest."

Safety can be enhanced by anticipating danger. Leary and colleagues describe how interpersonal rejection may be one of the most common precursors to aggression. While boundary-holding is a key aspect of TVIC, avoiding a sudden and dramatic devaluation in an interpersonal relationship can reduce the subjective experience of rejection and reduce the risk violent aggression.

Relationship 
The nature and quality of the relationship between two people talking about trauma can have a significant impact on the outcome of the discussion.

Communication 
Traumatic experiences, including childhood attachment trauma, can impact memory function and communication style.

Katz describes some experiences working with her legal clients and how she adjusts her relational and communication approach to meet their needs. Some clients need information delivered in short pieces with extra time to process, and some need to not have unannounced phone calls and be informed by email prior to verbal discussions. TVIC helped her shift from thinking about how to develop a "litigation strategy" for clients, to thinking about developing a "representation strategy", which is a major shift in thinking for many lawyers.

Nurses can use enhanced communication skills, such as mindful presence, enhanced listening skills including the use of mirroring and rephrasing statements, allowing short periods of silence as a strategy to facilitate safety, and minimizing the use of "no" statements to facilitate patients sense of safety.

Resilience and strength building 
Building psychological resilience and leveraging a person's existing strengths is a common element in most or all TVIC models.

Integration of principles 
Safety and relationship are intertwined. Roger's person-centered theory is founded on this basic principle. Attachment theory describes how a child's survival and well-being are dependent on a protective relationship with at least one primary caregiver. Badenoch's first principle of trauma-informed counseling is to use the practice of nonjudgmental and agendaless presence to create a foundation of safety and co-regulation. "Once the [client] sees (or feels) that the [professional] understands, then together they can begin the dangerous journey from where the [client] is, across the chasm, to safety."

Talking about trauma 
Researchers and clinicians describe how to talk about trauma, particularly when people are reluctant to bring it up. Read and colleagues offer comprehensive details for mental health professionals navigating the discussion.

There are numerous barriers for professionals which can inhibit raising discussions about trauma with clients/patients. They include lack of time, being too risk-averse, lack of training and understanding of trauma, fear of discussing emotions and difficult situations, fear of upsetting clients, male or older clients, lack of opportunity to reflect on professional experiences, over-reliance on non trauma-informed care models (such as traditional psychology, and biomedical and biogenetic models of mental distress).

Trauma discussions may include the following techniques and principles.

 Ask every client about trauma experience, especially in initial assessment of general psychosocial history.
 To establish relational safety and trust, or rapport, approach people sensitively while attuning to their emotions, nonverbal expressions, what they are saying, and what they might be excluding from their narrative. A stance of agendaless presence helps professionals reduce judgmentalism.
 Consider confidentiality needs. Some people are hesitant to disclose some or all of their experience, and may wish to maintain control over to whom or in what context it is disclosed. Attorney-client privilege, so long as not waived and there is no mandatory reporting requirement, offers the strongest protection for chosen non-disclosure.
 It's best to raise trauma topics in non-crisis situations, but at least after creating a measure of safety and trust within the relationship.
 Be prepared for clients to not admit traumatic experiences, while learning to recognize signs of the effects of traumatic experiences.
 Preface trauma questions with brief normalizing statements.
 Obtain details about the experience only if it necessary to do so.
 Use specific questions rather than generalized questions if you need detail, such as "Were you hit/pushed/spat on/held down?" as opposed to "Were you assaulted?" or "Was there domestic violence?"
 Ask if there has been a prior disclosure, and if so, what the person's experience of that was.
 Be mindful of sensitive emotions such as shame and humiliation.
 Pace the discussion according to the person's needs and abilities.
 Give choices, including whether to talk about it or not, and what to do about it. Avoid or be cautious in pressuring people to discuss trauma and make specific decisions.
 Work collaboratively, in partnership, with the person to explore appropriate solutions which are acceptable to the client and within the professional's abilities to offer.
 Ask about or confirm your understanding of current safety and danger.
 Offer relatively comprehensive trauma support and protection options. Particularly if the discussion about trauma is extensive, a lack of follow up support options can lead to re-traumatization.
 Offer relevant safety plan suggestions or where to find information about safety plans.
 Ask how they are feeling about the discussion at the end.
 Offer a follow-up appointment, and ask what they plan to do next.

Specific applications and techniques of TVIC 
Trauma- and violence-informed practices can be or are addressed in mindfulness programs, yoga, education, obstetrics and gynaecology, cancer treatment, psychological trauma in older adults, military sexual trauma, cybersex trafficking, sex trafficking and trafficking of children, child advocacy, decarceration efforts, and peer support. HDR, Inc. incorporates trauma-informed design principles in prison architecture.

Many therapy models utilize TVIC principles, including psychodynamic theory, trauma focused cognitive behavioral therapy, trauma-informed feminist therapy, Trauma systems therapy which utilizes EMDR, trauma focused CBT, and a number of other techniques, The Art of Yoga Project, the Wellness Recovery Action Plan, music therapy, internet-based treatments for trauma survivors, and aging.

TVIC principles are applied in child welfare services, child abuse, social work, psychology, medicine, Nursing, correctional services. They have been applied in interpersonal abuse situations including domestic violence, elder abuse.

Culturally-focused applications, often considering indigenous-specific traumas have been applied in minoritized communities, and Maori culture.

Domestic violence 
TVIC principles are widely used in domestic violence and intimate partner violence (IPV) situations. For working with survivors, TVIC has been combined with yoga, motivational interviewing, primary physician care in sexual assault cases, improving access to employment, cases involving HIV and IPV, and cases involving PTSD and IPV.

In 2015 Wilson and colleagues reviewed literature describing trauma-informed practices (TIP) used in the DV context. They found principles organized around six clusters. Promoting safety, giving choice and control, and building healthy relationships are particularly important TVIC concepts in this field.

 Promote emotional safety: Consider design options of physical environment. Promote a staff-wide approach to nonjudgmental interactions with clients. Develop organizational policies and communicate them clearly.
 Restore choice and control: Give choice and control broadly (it was taken from them previously). Allow clients to tell their stories in their own way and speed. Actively solicit client input on which services they want to utilize.
 Facilitate healing connections: Professionals should develop enhanced listening and relationship skills, and use these to build a supporting and trusted relationship with the client. This is sometimes called a person-centered approach. Listening skills can involve active listening, expressing no judgment, listening with the intent hear rather than with the intent to respond, and agendaless presence. Clients can be helped to develop healthy relationships at every level, including parent-child, and between survivors and their communities.
 Support coping: Provide clients neurobiopsycho-education about the nature and effects of DV. Help clients gain an awareness of triggers, perhaps with a triggers checklist. Validate and help strengthen client coping, or self-protective strategies. Develop a company-wide holistic and multidimensional approach improving client well-being, which includes healthy eating and living, and managing stress hormone activation.
 Respond to identify and context: Be mindful and responsive to gender, race, sexual orientation, ability, culture, immigration status, language, and social and historical contexts. These considerations can be reflected in informational materials. Gain awareness of assumptions based on identity and context. Organizations should be designed to be able to represent the diversity of its clients.
 Build strengths: Professionals can develop skills to identify, affirmatively value, and focus on client strengths. Ask "What helped in the past?" Help develop client leadership skills.

Hospice care 
In hospice situations, Feldman describes a multi-stage TIC process. In stage one practitioners alleviate distress by taking actions on behalf of clients. This is unlike many social work approaches which first work to empower clients to solve their own problems. Many hospice patients have little time or energy to take actions on their own. In stage two, the patient is offered tools, psychoeducation and support to cope with distress and trauma impacts. Stage three involves full-threshold PTSD treatment. The last stage is less common based on limited prognosis.

Ethical guidelines 
Ethical guidelines and principles imply and support TVIC-specific frameworks.

Rudolph describes how to conceptualize and apply TIC in health care settings using egalitarian, relational, narrative and prinicplist ethical frameworks. (The clinical case vignette in Rudolph's article is informative.)

 Egalitarian-based ethics provide a foundation to think about how socioeconomic factors influence power and privilege to create and perpetuate loss of agency, oppression and trauma. Those factors include gender, race, education, income, and culture. One ethical approach is to provide people, especially those silenced and marginalized, the opportunity to have meaningful voice and choice.
 Care ethics and its relational approach promotes awareness for the need and value of compassion and empathy, integrating both patient and provider perspectives, and promoting patient safety, agency, and therapeutic alliance. The relational approach also orients clinical treatment to consider subjective and objective decision making factors rather than merely abstract or academic norms.
 Narrative ethics encourage providers to consider patient history and experience in a broader context such as a biopsychosocial approach to healing. A deliberate and explicit narrative approach promotes both fuller patient disclosure and provider empathy and efforts to reach a collaborative care alliance. This can lead to enhanced patient-centered moral judgments and care outcomes.
 Principlist ethics offers four equal moral principles to balance in individual cases. These are the right of patients to make decisions (autonomy), promotion of patient welfare (beneficence), avoidance of patient harm (nonmaleficence), and justice through the fair allocation of scarce resources. These principles align with and support TVIC frameworks and goals.

Vadervort and colleagues describe how child welfare workers can experience trauma participating in legal proceedings and how understanding professional ethics can reduce their trauma experiences.

Organizational applications and techniques of TVIC 
TVIC principles have been applied in organizations, including behavioral health services, and policy analysis.

The Connecticut Department of Children and Families (DCF) implemented wide-ranging TVIC policies, which were analyzed over a five year period by Connell and colleagues in a research study. TVIC components included 1) workforce development, 2) trauma screening, 3) supports for secondary traumatic stress, 4) dissemination of trauma-focused evidence-based treatments (EBTs), and 5) development of trauma-informed policy and practice guides. The study found significant and enduring improvements in DCF's capacity to provide trauma-informed care. DCF employees became more aware of TVIC services and policies, although there was less improvement in awareness of efforts to implement new practices. The Child Welfare Trauma Toolkit Training program was one program implemented.

Organizations and people promoting TVIC 

Organizations which have or support TVIC programs include the Substance Abuse and Mental Health Services Administration (SAMHSA), National Center for Trauma-informed care, the National Child Traumatic Stress Network, the Surgeon General of California, National Center for Victims of Crime, The Exodus Road, Stetson School, and the American Institutes for Research.

Psychologist Diana Fosha promotes the use of therapeutic models and approaches which integrate relevant neurobiological processes, including implicit memory, and cognitive, emotional and sensorimotor processing. Ricky Greenwald applies eye movement desensitization and reprocessing (EMDR) and founded the Trauma Institute & Child Trauma Institute. Lady Edwina Grosvenor promotes a trauma informed approach in women's prisons in the United Kingdom. Joy Hofmeister promotes trauma-informed instruction for educators in Oklahoma. Anna Baranowsky developed the Traumatology Institute and addresses secondary trauma and effective PTSD techniques.

Other notable people who have developed or promoted TVIC programs include Tania Glyde, Carol Wick, Pat Frankish, Michael Huggins, Brad Lamm, Barbara Voss, Cathy Malchiodi, Activists, journalists and artists supporting TVIC awareness include Liz Mullinar, Omar Bah, Ruthie Bolton, Caoimhe Butterly, and Gang Badoy.

Effectiveness 
Some efforts have been made to measure the effectiveness of TVIC implementations.

Wathen and colleagues conducted a scoping review in 2020 and concluded that of the 13 measures they examined which assess TVIC effectiveness, none fully assessed the effectiveness of interventions to implement TVIC (and TIC). The measures they examined mostly assessed for TVIC principles of understanding and safety, and fewer looked at collaboration, choice, strength-based and capacity-building. They found several challenges to assessing the effectiveness of TVIC implementations, or existence of vicarious trauma. There was an apparent lack of clarity on how TVIC theory related to the measure's development and validation approaches so it was not always clear precisely what was being investigated. Another is the broad range of topics within the TVIC framework. They found no assessment measured for implicit bias in professionals. They found conflation of "trauma focused", such as may be used in primary health care, policing and education, with "trauma informed" where trauma specific services are routinely provided.

References 

Psychology
Domestic violence
Counseling
Law
Medical ethics
Violence